Eurygnathus latreillei is a species of beetles in the family Carabidae, the only species in the genus Eurygnathus.

References

Licininae
Monotypic Carabidae genera
Beetles described in 1834